The women's heptathlon event at the 2019 African Games was held on 28 and 29 August in Rabat.

Medalists

Results

100 metres hurdles
Wind: +1.3 m/s

High jump

Shot put

200 metres
Wind: +0.4 m/s

Long jump

Javelin throw

800 metres

Final standings

References

Heptathlon